KGLM-FM (97.7 MHz, "Magic 97.7 & 100.3") is a commercial radio station in Anaconda, Montana, broadcasting to the Butte, Montana, area playing CHR-Pop music. The station, established in 1974, is currently owned by Butte Broadcasting, Inc. The main offices and studios of Butte Broadcasting are at 660 Dewey in Butte. The transmitter site is north of Sheep Gulch Road in Anaconda, Montana.

FM Translator
KGLM relays its programming to an FM translator in order to improve coverage.

History

The station started in the 1970s by broadcasting country music.  However, with the debut of 96.9 "The River", the station flipped to an Adult top 40 format in 2002, focusing on current pop mixed with retro hits due to a hole in the market, As the 2000s went on the station moved more closer to top 40 and leaned more and more toward top 40 before becoming a CHR station in 2010.

KGLM-FM airs the "Hits Now!" music format from Dial Global Networks and is Butte's home for American Top 40.

Ownership
In December 2006, a deal was reached for KGLM-FM to be acquired by Butte Broadcasting, Inc. (Ronald Davis, president/general manager) from Jim Ray Carroll as part of a three-station deal with a total reported sale price of $500,000.

References

External links
Official website

GLM-FM
Radio stations established in 1974
Contemporary hit radio stations in the United States
1974 establishments in Montana